Samuel S. Shubert (August 27, 1878 – May 13, 1905) was an American producer and theatre owner/operator. He was the middle son in the Shubert family and was raised in Syracuse, New York.

Biography

Born in Vladislavov, in the Suwałki Governorate of Congress Poland, a part of the Russian Empire (present-day Kudirkos Naumiestis, Lithuania) to a Lithuanian-Jewish family, he was the second son and fifth child of Duvvid Schubart and Katrina Helwitz. He was four years old when the family emigrated to the United States in 1881. They settled in Syracuse, New York, where a number of Jewish families from there already were living. His father's alcoholism kept the family in difficult financial circumstances, and at a very young age Sam Shubert had to work as a shoeshine boy.

Syracuse operations
He eventually obtained a job at the Grand Opera House, selling programs and working in the box office. Although he had only rudimentary education, Sam Shubert had a quick mind for mathematics, which resulted in his promotion to assistant treasurer. After accepting the position of treasurer at the Wieting Theatre, the largest in the city of Syracuse, Shubert soon developed an interest in the production of plays. With borrowed money, he embarked on a venture that led him and his two brothers to be the successful operators of several theaters in upstate New York.

Theatre empire

The Shubert brothers decided to expand to the huge market in New York City and at the end of March 1900, Sam Shubert leased the Herald Square Theatre at the corner of Broadway and 35th Street in Manhattan. Leaving younger brother Jacob at home to manage their existing theatres, he and older brother Lee moved to New York City, where they laid the foundation for what was to become the largest theatre empire in the 20th century.

Sam Shubert had the idea for his first original production, Fantana, which premiered at the Lyric Theatre on January 14, 1905. "The show was Sam's idea, and he more or less cowrote the libretto. When his coauthor, Robert B. Smith, claimed to have done all the actual writing, Sam admitted that he had but would not change the credits."  He also took the directing credit for the 1904 revival of the comedy opera Wang: "under the personal direction of Sam. S. Shubert."

Railroad accident

In May 1905, Sam Shubert was traveling to Pittsburgh, Pennsylvania on business, when the passenger train he was on collided with several freight cars in the Lochiel neighborhood of south Harrisburg. Severely injured in the train wreck, Sam Shubert succumbed to his injuries two days later at the age of 26. His body was brought back to New York for burial in the Salem Fields Cemetery in Brooklyn.

In 1913, Sam Shubert's brothers opened a prestigious new theatre at 225 West 44th Street, in the heart of the Broadway Theater District, which was named in his honor. The Sam S. Shubert Theatre remains in operation today as one of the great landmarks of Broadway. In 1945, The Shubert Organization purchased the Majestic Theatre, at 22 West Monroe Street in Chicago, Illinois, and it too was renamed the Sam S. Shubert Theatre.

Notes
Hirsch, Foster. The Boys From Syracuse (1998), SIU Press.

References

External links

  Shubert Foundation biography

1878 births
1905 deaths
People from Kudirkos Naumiestis
Lithuanian Jews
Emigrants from the Russian Empire to the United States
American people of Lithuanian-Jewish descent
American theatre managers and producers
American entertainment industry businesspeople
Jewish American writers
Businesspeople from Syracuse, New York
Shubert Organization
Railway accident deaths in the United States
Accidental deaths in Pennsylvania
Burials at Salem Fields Cemetery
19th-century American businesspeople